In mathematics, the Fréchet filter, also called the cofinite filter, on a set  is a certain collection of subsets of  (that is, it is a particular subset of the power set of ).

The Fréchet filter is of interest in topology, where filters originated, and relates to order and lattice theory because a set's power set is a partially ordered set  under set inclusion (more specifically, it forms a lattice).
The Fréchet filter is named after the French mathematician Maurice Fréchet (1878-1973), who worked in topology.

Definition

That is:

Intersection condition If two sets are finitely complemented in  then so is their intersection, since  and

Properties

This case is sometimes excluded by definition or else called the improper filter on  Allowing  to be finite creates a single exception to the Fréchet filter's being free and non-principal since a filter on a finite set cannot be free and a non-principal filter cannot contain any singletons as members.

Additionally,  is infinite since one of its subsets is the set of all  where 

The Fréchet filter is both free and non-principal, excepting the finite case mentioned above, and is included in every free filter.
It is also the dual filter of the ideal of all finite subsets of (infinite) .

The Fréchet filter is  necessarily an ultrafilter (or maximal proper filter).
Consider the power set  where  is the natural numbers.
The set of even numbers is the complement of the set of odd numbers. Since neither of these sets is finite, neither set is in the Fréchet filter on 
The ultrafilter lemma states that every non-degenerate filter is contained in some ultrafilter.
The existence of free ultrafilters was established by Tarski in 1930, relying on a theorem equivalent to the axiom of choice and is used in the construction of the hyperreals in nonstandard analysis.

Examples

On the set  of natural numbers, the set of infinite intervals

See also

References

External links

 
 J.B. Nation, Notes on Lattice Theory, course notes, revised 2017.

Order theory
Topology